Median fissure may refer to:

 Anterior median fissure of the spinal cord
 Anterior median fissure of the medulla oblongata
 Posterior median sulcus of medulla oblongata, also known as posterior median fissure